Medford Township may refer to:

 Medford Township, in Reno County, Kansas
 Medford Township, Steele County, Minnesota 
 Medford Township, New Jersey
 Medford Township, Walsh County, North Dakota
 Medford Township, Grant County, Oklahoma, see List of Oklahoma townships

See also
 Medford (disambiguation)

Township name disambiguation pages